Death Stone is a 1987 German-Sri-Lankan action film directed by Franz Josef Gottlieb and starring Albert Fortell, Heather Thomas, Elke Sommer, and Brad Harris.  It was also released as Perahera and Jungle Fire.

Plot
While in Sri Lanka attending the Esala Perahera festival, a man's girlfriend goes missing and is later found dead of a drug overdose. He then sets about going after the criminals who killed her.

Cast

Home media
In 2011 this film was released on DVD. The disc contains a German version of this film and as addition an interview with Brad Harris in English. Brad Harris talks about this film as well as about his film career in general.

Background
Brad Harris also states in the aforementioned interview he had written parts of the screenplay and was responsible for the choreography of all fights. Among other things he also mentions the Italian actors had brought provisions from Italy with them and had advised the cooks in their hotels to fix them meals à la Italian cuisine.

References

Bibliography

External links

1987 films
1980s adventure drama films
German adventure drama films
West German films
Sri Lankan adventure films
1980s German-language films
Films set in Sri Lanka
Films directed by Franz Josef Gottlieb
1987 drama films
1980s German films